DMH may refer to

Deenanath Mangeshkar Hospital, Pune
Department of Mental Health (disambiguation)
Dimethylhydantoin
Dimethylhydrazine
Dimenhydrinate
Marine Histories Doctorate (this a degree in underwater archaeology and is also shown as a Doctor of Marine Histories or DMH)
Dorsomedial hypothalamic nucleus
 Differential methylation hybridization (method used for DNA methylation profiling)